The Hispano-Suiza Maguari is a sports car produced by Hispano Suiza Automobilmanufaktur.

History
The Maguari was previewed by the Hispano-Suiza V10 Supercharged which was presented at the Geneva Motor Show in 2010. The Maguari was presented in March 2019. In February 2022, Hispano Suiza Engineering filed for bankruptcy. Two prototypes of the vehicle were to already exist at this point. On 1 March 2022, Hispano Suiza Automobilmanufaktur announced that series production of the 300 vehicles had started with a price tag of €2.2 million. 

The name of the vehicle comes from the Maguari stork.

Specifications
The Maguari originally intended to offer a 5.2-liter V10 mid-engine with twin turbochargers and a maximum output of 798 kW (1085 hp) from Lamborghini. The information was changed at the start of production. The production model now has a displacement of 5.5 liters and a maximum output of 883 kW (1200 hp).

Notes

External links 
Hispano Suiza Automobilmanufaktur website

Maguari
Coupés
Sports cars
Rear mid-engine, rear-wheel-drive vehicles
Cars introduced in 2019